The 2006 United States Senate election in Rhode Island was held on November 7, 2006. Incumbent Republican Lincoln Chafee sought re-election to a second full term in office, the seat he had held since 1999 when he was appointed to fill the vacancy created by the death of his father John Chafee. He lost to Democratic nominee, former state Attorney General Sheldon Whitehouse by a 7-point margin. 

, this was the last time the Republican candidates won the counties of Bristol and Washington in a statewide election. Democrats won this Senate seat for the first time since 1970. Chafee would go on to run for governor and was elected in 2010.

Democratic primary

Candidates 
 Carl Sheeler, Marine veteran
 Sheldon Whitehouse, former Attorney General of Rhode Island and former U.S. Attorney for the District of Rhode Island
 Christopher F. Young, activist and perennial candidate

Campaign 
Whitehouse was endorsed by U.S. Senator Jack Reed, U.S. Congressmen Jim Langevin and Patrick J. Kennedy, as well as by former candidate Matt Brown. Sheeler, a former U.S. Marine, a business owner, and an adjunct professor of business, ran on a more progressive platform. Ultimately, however, Whitehouse would trounce his competition in the primary on September 12, winning his party's support by a large margin.

Results

Republican primary

Candidates 
 Lincoln Chafee, incumbent U.S. Senator
 Steve Laffey, Mayor of Cranston

Campaign 
Incumbent Lincoln Chafee was one of the most liberal members of the Republican Party in the Senate by 2006, and was challenged for the Republican nomination by Laffey who had criticized Chafee for his liberal voting record in the Senate. In early 2006, the Club for Growth, a pro-tax cut political action committee, sent a series of mailings to Rhode Island Republicans attacking Chafee's positions and voting record.

The national GOP supported Chafee in the primary campaign, believing that he was the most likely candidate to hold the seat in the general election. Senator Mitch McConnell of Kentucky, Senator John McCain of Arizona and First Lady Laura Bush appeared at fundraisers for Chafee, while Senator Bill Frist's PAC donated to Chafee.  The National Republican Senatorial Committee also ran ads in the state supporting Chafee. Steve Laffey, however, picked up many endorsements from Republican town committees throughout Rhode Island, the national group Club for Growth, and former candidate for the party's Presidential nomination Steve Forbes.  On July 10, 2006, the National Republican Senatorial Committee filed a complaint with the Federal Election Commission against Laffey, saying that he had included a political communication in tax bills mailed to residents of Cranston.

Debates 
Complete video of debate, August 23, 2006 - C-SPAN
Complete video of debate, August 26, 2006 - C-SPAN

Polling

Results

General election

Candidates 
 Lincoln Chafee (R), incumbent U.S. Senator
 Sheldon Whitehouse (D), former state Attorney General

Campaign 
Democrats believed that this was one of the most likely Senate seats to switch party control, due to the Democratic tilt of Rhode Island, as well as the fact that Chafee needed to expend part of his campaign fund to win the Republican primary election. Chafee's approval ratings also took a beating from his primary battle with Laffey and may have hurt him in the general election. Another factor that hurt Chafee was the fact that Whitehouse, the Democratic nominee, had a huge head start on him, as he was able to campaign with little opposition for at least half the year and had not had to contend with a major opponent until the general election campaign. Rhode Islanders' historically large disapproval ratings for President Bush and the Republican Party as a whole was another major hurdle for Chafee.

Debates
Complete video of debate, October 19, 2006 - C-SPAN
Complete video of debate, October 30, 2006 - C-SPAN

Issues 
Whitehouse and Chafee did not have large differences on political issues. On social issues, they were almost entirely in agreement with each other. Chafee was also against the Bush tax cuts. On fiscal issues, such as social security and trade, they were however in disagreement.

 Abortion
 Chafee - pro-choice
 Whitehouse - pro-choice
 Stem-Cell research
 Chafee - support
 Whitehouse - support
 Death penalty
 Chafee - strongly opposes
 Whitehouse - support in federal level, but not in state level
 Gay Marriage
 Chafee - supports
 Whitehouse - supports
 Privatizing Social Security
 Chafee - Partially Supports
 Whitehouse - Strongly Against
 Bush Tax Cuts
 Chafee - Strongly against
 Whitehouse - Strongly against
 Vouchers
 Chafee - rated 55% by NEA, representing a mixed record
 Whitehouse - Strongly against
 Federal Spending on Health Care
 Chafee - Strongly supports
 Whitehouse - Strongly supports
 PATRIOT Act
 Chafee - supports
 Whitehouse - against
 Free Trade
 Chafee - supports
 Whitehouse - against

Predictions

Polling 

with Steve Laffey

Results

Analysis 
Whitehouse carried Providence County, which contains approximately 60% of the state's population, with 59% to Chafee's 41%.  Chafee's strongest showing was in Washington County (South County), where he took 55% of the vote against Whitehouse's 45%.

After the election, when asked by a reporter if he thought his defeat would help the country by giving Democrats control of Congress, Chafee replied, "to be honest, yes."

See also 
 2006 United States Senate elections

References

External links 
 Sheldon Whitehouse for Senate
 Senator Chafee Earns Sierra Club Endorsement
 Rhode Island Election Results

Rhode Island
2006
2006 Rhode Island elections
Lincoln Chafee